San Francisco de Chiu Chiu, or simply Chiu Chiu, is a village located about  northeast of the city of Calama, in El Loa Province of Chile's northern Antofagasta Region.

San Francisco de Chiu Chiu Church, built in the 17th century, is the main attraction in the village.

External links
 Consejo de Monumentos Nacionales de Chile: Pueblo de San Francisco de Chiu Chiu

San Francisco de Chiu Chiu

Populated places in El Loa Province